Sindh Sudhar Sindhi: , the first publication in Sindhi language was started in 1884. Initially published by Education department of Sindh was taken out later by Sindh Saba. Sadhu Hiranand was its first editor from 1884-87.

References

Sindhi literature
Sindhi-language mass media